is a Japanese footballer currently playing as a midfielder for Thespakusatsu Gunma.

Career statistics

Club
.

Notes

References

External links

1998 births
Living people
Takushoku University alumni
Japanese footballers
Association football midfielders
Thespakusatsu Gunma players
21st-century Japanese people